Elizabeth Constance Griffin (5 May 1945 – 10 June 2015) was Montserratian female barrister. She was the first-ever female barrister in the British Crown Colony of Montserrat.

Background 
Griffin was born on the island of Antigua to Charles Griffin, M.D. and social worker Patricia Griffin. She later moved with her family to London, England, at the age of eight.

Education and career 
She earned her law degree from Oxford University. During this time, she also passed her Duke of Edinburgh's Award. 

Following graduation, she returned to Montserrat to work for the Attorney General of Montserrat as a legal assistant as part of her pupillage before becoming a barrister. In 1969, she was called to the bar as Montserrat's first female barrister. In front of a court viewed mostly by women, Griffin stated that she would "endeavor to set the highest standards for any ladies who follow me."

Griffin later lectured at the West Kent College in Tonbridge, England. In 1993, upon moving back to London, she began teaching at the Inns of Court School of Law.

Personal life 
In 1970, Griffin married Andrew George Prideaux (born 1945). Her children are Michael (born 1971) and the late Louisa (born 1974). She has three grandchildren, Flora (born 2004), Ned (born 2006) and William Prideaux (born 2009). She moved to Lewes, East Sussex, England, and  she later moved to Stockbridge, Hampshire, where she died in 2015.

References 

1945 births
2015 deaths
Montserratian lawyers
Women lawyers
Barristers and advocates